The States' Rights Democratic Party (whose members are often called the Dixiecrats) was a short-lived segregationist political party in the United States, active primarily in the South. It arose due to a Southern regional split in opposition to members of the Democratic Party in the North. After President Harry S. Truman, a member of the Democratic Party, ordered integration of the military in 1948 and other actions to address civil rights of African Americans, many Southern white politicians who objected to this course organized themselves as a breakaway faction. They wished to protect the ability of states to maintain racial segregation.

In the 1930s, a political realignment occurred largely due to the New Deal policies of President Franklin D. Roosevelt. While many Democrats in the South had shifted toward favoring economic intervention, civil rights for African Americans was not specifically incorporated within the New Deal agenda, due in part to Southern control over many key positions of power within the U.S. Congress. Supporters assumed control of the state Democratic parties in part or in full in several Southern states. They opposed racial integration and wanted to retain Jim Crow laws and other aspects of codified racial discrimination in the face of possible federal intervention. Its members were referred to as "Dixiecrats", a portmanteau of "Dixie", referring to the Southern United States, and "Democrat".

Despite the Dixiecrats' success in several states, Truman was narrowly re-elected. After the 1948 election, its leaders generally returned to the Democratic Party.  The Dixiecrats' presidential candidate, Strom Thurmond, became a Republican in 1964. The Dixiecrats represented the weakening of the "Solid South". (This referred to the Southern Democratic Party's control of presidential elections in the South and most seats in Congress, partly through decades of disfranchisement of blacks entrenched by Southern state legislatures between 1890 and 1908. Blacks had formerly been aligned with the Republican Party before being excluded from politics in the region, but during the Great Migration African Americans had found the Democratic Party in the North and West more suited to their interests.)

Background 

Since the beginning of Reconstruction, Southern white voters supported the Democratic Party by overwhelming margins in both local and national elections, (the few exceptions include minor pockets of Republican electoral strength in Appalachia, East Tennessee in particular, Gillespie and Kendall Counties of central Texas) forming what was known as the "Solid South". Even during the last years of Reconstruction, Democrats used paramilitary insurgents and other activists to disrupt and intimidate Republican freedman voters, including fraud at the polls and attacks on their leaders. The electoral violence culminated in the Democrats regaining control of the state legislatures and passing new constitutions and laws from 1890 to 1908 to disenfranchise most blacks and many poor whites. They also imposed Jim Crow, a combination of legal and informal segregation acts that made blacks second-class citizens, confirming their lack of political power through most of the southern United States. The social and economic systems of the Solid South were based on this structure, although the white Democrats retained all the Congressional seats apportioned for the total population of their states.

Three-time Democratic Party presidential candidate William Jennings Bryan opposed a highly controversial resolution at the 1924 Democratic National Convention condemning the Ku Klux Klan, expecting the organization would soon fold. Bryan disliked the Klan but never publicly attacked it.

In the 1930s, a political realignment occurred largely due to the New Deal policies of President Franklin D. Roosevelt. While many Democrats in the South had shifted toward favoring economic intervention, civil rights for African Americans was not specifically incorporated within the New Deal agenda, due in part to Southern control over many key positions of power within the U.S. Congress.

With the entry of the United States into the Second World War, Jim Crow was indirectly challenged. More than one and a half million black Americans served in the U.S. military during World War II, where they received equal pay while serving within segregated units. (While equally entitled to receive veterans' benefits after the war, the vast majority of African American veterans were prevented from accessing most benefits due in part to Southern success in congress to have benefits administered by the states instead of the federal government.) Tens of thousands of black civilians at home were recruited in the labor-starved war industries across many urban centers in the country, mainly due to the promotion of Executive Order 8802, which required defense industries not to discriminate based on ethnicity or race.

Members of the Republican Party (which nominated Governor of New York Thomas E. Dewey in 1944 and 1948), along with many Democrats from the northern and western states, supported civil rights legislation that the Deep South Democrats in Congress almost unanimously opposed.

1948 presidential election

After Roosevelt died, the new president Harry S. Truman established a highly visible President's Committee on Civil Rights and issued Executive Order 9981 to end discrimination in the military in 1948. A group of Southern governors, including Strom Thurmond of South Carolina and Fielding L. Wright of Mississippi, met to consider the place of Southerners within the Democratic Party. After a tense meeting with Democratic National Committee (DNC) chairman and Truman confidant J. Howard McGrath, the Southern governors agreed to convene their own convention in Birmingham, Alabama if Truman and civil rights supporters emerged victorious at the 1948 Democratic National Convention. In July, the convention nominated Truman to run for a full term and adopted a plank proposed by Northern liberals led by Hubert Humphrey calling for civil rights; 35 Southern delegates walked out. The move was on to remove Truman's name from the ballot in the southern United States. This political maneuvering required the organization of a new and distinct political party, which the Southern defectors from the Democratic Party chose to brand as the States' Rights Democratic Party.

Just days after the 1948 Democratic National Convention, the States' Rights Democrats held their own convention at Municipal Auditorium in Birmingham, on July 17. While several leaders from the Deep South such as Strom Thurmond and James Eastland attended, most major Southern Democrats did not attend the conference. Among those absent were Georgia Senator Richard Russell Jr., who had finished with the second-most delegates in the Democratic presidential ballot.

Prior to their own States' Rights Democratic Party convention, it was not clear whether the Dixiecrats would seek to field their own candidate or simply try to prevent Southern electors from voting for Truman. Many in the press predicted that if the Dixiecrats did nominate a ticket, Arkansas Governor Benjamin Travis Laney would be the presidential nominee, and South Carolina Governor Strom Thurmond or Mississippi Governor Fielding L. Wright the vice presidential nominee. Laney traveled to Birmingham during the convention, but he ultimately decided that he did not want to join a third party and remained in his hotel during the convention. Thurmond himself had doubts about a third-party bid, but party organizers convinced him to accept the party's nomination, with Fielding Wright as his running mate. Wright's supporters had hoped that Wright would lead the ticket, but Wright deferred to Thurmond, who had greater national stature. The selection of Thurmond received fairly positive reviews from the national press, as Thurmond had pursued relatively moderate policies on civil rights and did not employ the fiery rhetoric used by other segregationist leaders.

The States' Rights Democrats did not formally declare themselves as being a new third party, but rather said that they were only "recommending" that state Democratic Parties vote for the Thurmond–Wright ticket. The goal of the party was to win the 127 electoral votes of the Solid South, in the hopes of denying Truman–Barkley or Dewey–Warren an overall majority of electoral votes, and thus throwing the presidential election to the United States House of Representatives and the vice presidential election to the United States Senate. Once in the House and Senate, the Dixiecrats hoped to throw their support to whichever party would agree to their segregationist demands. Even if the Republican ticket won an outright majority of electoral votes (as many expected in 1948), the Dixiecrats hoped that their third-party run would help the South retake its dominant position in the Democratic Party. In implementing their strategy, the States' Rights Democrats faced a complicated set of state election laws, with different states having different processes for choosing presidential electors. The States' Rights Democrats eventually succeeded in making the Thurmond–Wright ticket the official Democratic ticket in Alabama, Louisiana, Mississippi, and South Carolina. In other states, they were forced to run as a third-party ticket.

In numbers greater than the 6,000 that attended the first, the States' Rights Democrats held a boisterous second convention in Oklahoma City, on August 14, 1948, where they adopted their party platform which stated:

The platform went on to say:

In Arkansas, Democratic gubernatorial nominee Sid McMath vigorously supported Truman in speeches across the state, much to the consternation of the sitting governor, Benjamin Travis Laney, an ardent Thurmond supporter. Laney later used McMath's pro-Truman stance against him in the 1950 gubernatorial election, but McMath won re-election handily.

Efforts by States' Rights Democrats to paint other Truman loyalists as turncoats generally failed, although the seeds of discontent were planted which in years to come took their toll on Southern moderates.

On election day in 1948, the Thurmond–Wright ticket carried the previously solidly Democratic states of Alabama, Louisiana, Mississippi, and South Carolina, receiving 1,169,021 popular votes and 39 electoral votes. Progressive Party presidential nominee Henry A. Wallace drew off a nearly equal number of popular votes (1,157,172) from the Democrats' left wing, although he did not carry any states. The splits in the Democratic Party in the 1948 election had been expected to produce a victory by GOP presidential nominee Dewey, but Truman defeated Dewey in an upset victory.

Subsequent elections 
The States' Rights Democratic Party collapsed after the 1948 election, as Truman, the Democratic National Committee, and the New Deal Southern Democrats acted to ensure that the Dixiecrat movement would not return in the 1952 presidential election. Some Southern diehards, such as Leander Perez of Louisiana, attempted to keep it in existence in their districts.  Wright continued to defend states' rights and segregation, but conceded that complete obstinance along the lines of the 1948 departure from the Democratic Party would cause his home state of Mississippi to lose "its standing with everybody in America." Former Dixiecrats received some backlash at the 1952 Democratic National Convention, but all Southern delegations were seated after agreeing to a party loyalty pledge. Moderate Alabama Senator John Sparkman was selected as the Democratic vice presidential nominee in 1952, helping to boost party loyalty in the South.

Regardless of the power struggle within the Democratic Party concerning segregation policy, the South remained a strongly Democratic voting bloc for local, state, and federal Congressional elections, but increasingly not in presidential elections. Republican Dwight D. Eisenhower won several Southern states in the 1952 and 1956 presidential elections. In the 1956 election, former Commissioner of Internal Revenue T. Coleman Andrews received just under 0.2 percent of the popular vote running as the presidential nominee of the States' Rights Party. In the 1960 presidential election, Republican Richard Nixon won several Southern states, and Senator Harry F. Byrd of Virginia received the votes of several unpledged electors from Alabama and Mississippi. In the 1964 presidential election, Republican Barry Goldwater won all four states that Thurmond had carried in 1948. In the 1968 presidential election, Republican Richard Nixon or third party candidate George Wallace won every former Confederate state except Texas. Thurmond eventually left the Democratic Party and joined the Republican Party in 1964, charging the Democrats with having "abandoned the people" and having repudiated the U.S. Constitution; he subsequently worked on the presidential campaign of Barry Goldwater. Pulitzer prize winning American journalist Les Payne wrote in 2004 that Dixiecrats were affiliated with the KKK and opposed Martin Luther King Jr., the leader of the 1960's nonviolent Civil Rights Movement. In a 2016 article written by David Neiwert for the SPLC, Niewart stated that "When the members of the Klan were Democrats, as in the 1920s, as well as in the '40s when they called themselves "Dixiecrats," they were conservative Democrats."

Presidential candidate performance

See also
 Boll weevil (politics)
 Politics of the Southern United States
 Southern Democrats

Footnotes

Works cited

Further reading
 Bass, Jack, and Marilyn W. Thompson. Strom: The Complicated Personal and Political Life of Strom Thurmond (2006)
 Black, Earl, and Merle Black. Politics and Society in the South (1989)
 Buchanan, Scott. "The Dixiecrat Rebellion: Long-Term Partisan Implications in the Deep South", in Politics and Policy 33(4):754-769. (2005)
 Cohodas, Nadine. Strom Thurmond & the Politics of Southern Change (1995)
 Frederickson, Kari. The Dixiecrat Revolt and the End of the Solid South, 1932–1968 (2001)
 Karabell, Zachary. The Last Campaign: How Harry Truman Won the 1948 Election (2001)
 Perman, Michael. Pursuit of Unity: A Political History of the American South (2009)

External links
Scott E. Buchanan, Dixiecrats , New Georgia Encyclopedia.
1948 Platform of Oklahoma's Dixiecrats

 
Defunct political parties in the United States
History of the Southern United States
Factions in the Democratic Party (United States)
Strom Thurmond
Political terminology of the United States
Democratic Party (United States)
White supremacy in the United States
Political parties established in 1948
Political repression in the United States
1948 establishments in the United States
Political parties disestablished in 1948
1948 disestablishments in the United States
1948 United States presidential election
Politics of the Southern United States
Protestant political parties
White nationalist parties